The University of Washington College of Built Environments (CBE) is the architecture and urban planning school of the University of Washington, a public research university in Seattle, Washington. 

The College offers programs in architecture, construction management, landscape architecture, real estate, and urban planning. From 1957 to 2009, the College was known as the College of Architecture and Urban Planning (CAUP). Today, the College of Built Environments is made up of five core units: Architecture/Architectural Design, Construction Management, Landscape Architecture, Real Estate, and Urban Design & Planning. It also houses two interdisciplinary Ph.D. degrees, as well as several other interdisciplinary centers and institutes. The 2009 name change reflects an integrated approach to planning, design, and construction that will be necessary to take on the 21st-century global challenges of urbanization and climate change.

History

The College of Built Environments traces its history to 1914, when the Department of Architecture was founded (initially as a subdivision in a College of Fine Arts).  The department grew slowly and focused strictly on architecture until the early 1940s, when a city planning curriculum was inaugurated.  After the Second World War, the architecture and planning programs grew rapidly.  The College of Architecture and Urban Planning was established in 1957;  Arthur Herrman was the first dean.  Architecture and Urban Planning (now Urban Design and Planning) were established as separate departments within the CAUP by 1961;  Landscape Architecture and Building Construction (now Construction Management) were established as departments later in the 1960s.  In 2017 the program in Real Estate, initially housed in the Department of Urban Design & Planning, became the Runstad Department of Real Estate. Other degrees and programs were added in the last fifty years, for example the Ph.D. in the Built Environment in 2003.  In 2007 the faculty of the college began searching for a new name.  The Regents of the University of Washington approved the name in fall 2008.  The College of Built Environments name became official in January 2009.

Facilities

The College is housed in Gould Hall (named after Carl F. Gould, founder and first head of the Department of Architecture), Architecture Hall (constructed 1907–9 to serve as  a chemistry building, but used during the Alaska–Yukon–Pacific Exposition as the Fine Arts Palace), and several smaller structures. 

The College has multiple facilities for supporting the work of students, faculty, and staff, including the Fabrications Labs (a 6000 square foot facility with tools and equipment for wood and metal fabrication as well as CNC tools and equipment for digital fabrication), the Digital Commons (which houses Computing Services for the College), and the Visual Resources Collection. The Built Environments Library, a unit of the University of Washington Libraries is housed on the third floor of Gould Hall.

Departments, Programs, and Administration

The five CBE departments offer degrees in architecture, landscape architecture, construction management, urban planning and real estate. The College offers a college-wide Ph.D. in the Built Environment, and participates in an interdisciplinary Ph.D. in Planning.  Two interdisciplinary certificate programs are shared by multiple departments across the college: Urban Design and Historic Preservation.

The CBE is led by Dean Renée Cheng who is advised by several Associate Deans.  The Dean heads the CBE Executive Committee which includes the Associate Deans, the Department Chairs, and other administrative and staff leaders in the college.  The Dean is also advised by the College Council, the elected faculty council (similar to the elected faculty councils found in all University of Washington schools and colleges).  The College Council provides a structure for direct faculty input at the highest level of college administration.  The CBE also has a college-wide Staff Council and a college-wide Student Council, vehicles for staff and student participation in college governance.

Notable faculty 

 Steve Badanes
 Thomas Bosworth
 Francis D.K. Ching
 Meredith Clausen
 Lee Copeland
 Carl F. Gould
 Richard Haag
 Grant Hildebrand
 Phillip Jacobson
 Norman Johnston
 Wendell Lovett
 David Miller
 Jeffrey Ochsner
 Lionel Pries
 Hermann Pundt
 Michael Pyatok
 John Schaufelberger
 Paul Schell
 Victor Steinbrueck
 David Streatfield
 Sharon E. Sutton
 Harlan Thomas
 George Tsutakawa
 Astra Zarina

Notable alumni 

 Ken Anderson
 Ralph Anderson
 Elizabeth Ayer
 Fred Bassetti
 Welton Becket
 Leon Bridges
 Lee Copeland
 James K. M. Cheng
 Mary Lund Davis
 Dave Dederer
 Robert L. Durham
 Alexander Ifeanyichukwu Ekwueme
 L. Jane Hastings
 Anne Gould Hauberg
 Steven Holl
 Perry Johanson
 A. Quincy Jones
 Grant Jones
 Paul Hayden Kirk
 Tom Kundig
 Wendell Lovett
 Benjamin McAdoo
 David McKinley (architect)
 George Nakashima
 Laurie Olin
 Norman Pfeiffer
 Peter Steinbrueck
 Victor Steinbrueck
 Jennifer Taylor
 Roland Terry
 Paul Thiry
 Wang Chiu-Hwa
 Walter Wurdeman
 Minoru Yamasaki
 Astra Zarina

References 

 Booth, T. William, and Wilson, William H., Carl F. Gould:  A Life in Architecture and the Arts, University of Washington Press, Seattle and London 1995.
 Johnston, Norman J., Architectural Education at the University of Washington:  The Gould Years, College of Architecture and Urban Planning, Seattle 1987.
 Johnston, Norman J., The College of Architecture and Urban Planning, Seventy Five Years at the University of Washington:  A Personal View, College of Architecture and Urban Planning, Seattle 1991.
 Ochsner, Jeffrey Karl, Lionel H. Pries, Architect, Artist, Educator: From Arts and Crafts to Modern Architecture University of Washington Press, Seattle and London, 2007.  
 Ochsner, Jeffrey Karl, "Modern or Traditional? Lionel H. Pries and Architectural Education at the University of Washington, 1928-1942", Pacific Northwest Quarterly 96 (Summer 2005), pages 132-150.

External links 

College of Built Environments website

Built Environments
Architecture schools in Washington (state)
1957 establishments in Washington (state)